Andrew Martin is a British computer scientist at the University of Oxford, England, where he is Professor of Systems Security, Director of the Centre for Doctoral Training in Cyber Security  (2013-) and Deputy Director and lecturer in Software Engineering Programme.
He is a member of the Oxford University Department of Computer Science.

Education
He obtained BA in Mathematics and Computation (1986–1989) and  DPhil in Machine-Assisted Theorem Proving for Software Engineering (1991–1994) from the University of Oxford.

Career
After his first degree, he joined Praxis High Integrity Systems, Bath as Industrial Software Engineer. After his DPhil, he became Research Fellow at the Software Verification Research Centre in the University of Queensland in Australia. Before taking up his current post in 1999, he was briefly a lecturer in the University of Southampton.

Publications
Martin's publications cover software engineering, security, trusted computing in general and formal methods in particular

References

External links
 

Year of birth missing (living people)
Living people
Alumni of the University of Oxford
English computer scientists
British computer scientists
Academic staff of the University of Queensland
Academics of the University of Southampton
Members of the Department of Computer Science, University of Oxford
Fellows of Kellogg College, Oxford
Formal methods people